Maximiliano Rodrigo Pereira Cardozo (25 April 1993 – 26 December 2020) was an Uruguayan professional footballer who played as a defender.

Career
Born in Montevideo, Pereira played for Cerro, Miramar Misiones, Racing de Montevideo, Sport Boys, Deportivo Santaní, Liverpool and Central Español.

He accidentally drowned at the Salto del Penitente in Minas.

References

1993 births
2020 deaths
Uruguayan footballers
C.A. Cerro players
Miramar Misiones players
Racing Club de Montevideo players
Sport Boys footballers
Deportivo Santaní players
Liverpool F.C. (Montevideo) players
Central Español players
Uruguayan Primera División players
Uruguayan Segunda División players
Bolivian Primera División players
Paraguayan Primera División players
Association football defenders
Uruguayan expatriate footballers
Uruguayan expatriates in Bolivia
Expatriate footballers in Bolivia
Uruguayan expatriates in Paraguay
Expatriate footballers in Paraguay
Deaths by drowning